Events in the year 1931 in Turkey.

Parliament
 3rd Parliament of Turkey (up to 4 May)
 4th Parliament of Turkey (from 4 May)

Incumbents
President – Kemal Atatürk
Prime Minister – İsmet İnönü

Ruling party and the main opposition
 Ruling party – Republican People's Party (CHP)

Cabinet
6th government of Turkey (up to 5 May)
7th government of Turkey (from 5 May)

Events
26 March – International measurements were legalized
15 April – Turkish Historical Society was founded
4 May – General elections
5 May – 
Kemal Atatürk was reelected as the president
İsmet İnönü formed his new cabinet

Births
4 January – Coşkun Özarı , football coach
27 January – Gazanfer Özcan theatre actor
28 January – Naci Erdem, footballer 
7 July – Talat Sait Halman, politician, man of letters, 
10 September – Ece Ayhan, poet
6 December – Zeki Müren, singer

Deaths
3 March – Hasan İzzet Pasha (born in 1871), Ottoman general
31 July – Çürüksulu Mahmud Pasha (born in 1864), Ottoman admiral and politician 
15 September – Seniha Sultan (born in 1852), Ottoman princess
5 October – Selma Rıza (Feraceli), first Turkish female journalist
15 October – Veysel Özgür (born in 1877), military officer
23 December – Mehmet Rauf (born in 1875), novelist

Gallery

References

 
Years of the 20th century in Turkey
Turkey
Turkey
Turkey